Elias Ehlers (born 15 December 1985, Holstebro, Denmark) is a Danish stand-up comedian.

He was the winner of DM in stand-up 2006, TV2 Zulu Comedy Fight Club in 2007, and he has repeatedly appeared in Stand-up.dk and Comedy Aid. His acts often consist of self-irony, flashbacks to his childhood and political considerations.

References

External links 
 
 

1985 births
Living people
People from Holstebro
Danish male comedians
Danish stand-up comedians